Sonja Victoria Dyring (born 18 December 1972 in Uppsala) is a Swedish TV host and film producer. She is a former host of the knowledge TV program Hjärnkontoret. Since 2010 she has hosted Vetenskapens värld. She has also hosted and appeared on Vi i femman (2001–03, together with Jonas Hallberg), National Day celebrations, Nobel Prize programmes and Lilla Melodifestivalen (in 2003).

Education
Dyring's parents are science journalists and her sister is physicist. Dyring studied theatre at university. She has also studied natural science.

Awards
2002 - Gunilla Arhéns förebildspris
2010 - Dyring became honorary degree at University of Stockholm

References/sources

Living people
1972 births
Swedish television hosts
Swedish women television presenters
Swedish film producers
Swedish women film producers
People from Uppsala